L.I.F.E (an acronym for Leaving an Impact for Eternity) is the debut studio album by Nigerian singer Burna Boy. It was released on August 12, 2013, by Aristokrat Records. The album serves as the follow-up to his second mixtape Burn Identity (2011). L.I.F.E sold 40,000 copies on the first day of its release. Aristokrat Records later sold the album's marketing rights to Uba Pacific for ₦10 million. The album's release was preceded by five singles: "Like to Party", "Tonight", "Always Love You", "Run My Race" and "Yawa Dey".

Produced entirely by Leriq, L.I.F.E features guest appearances from 2face Idibia, M.I, Timaya, Olamide, Reminisce and Wizkid. Nigerian Entertainment Today ranked the album 10th on its list of the 12th Best Albums of 2013. The album's music draws heavily from the music of Fela Kuti, King Sunny Ade and Bob Marley. L.I.F.E received generally positive reviews from music critics, who applauded its production. It was nominated for Best Album of the Year at the 2014 Nigeria Entertainment Awards. It peaked at number 7 on the Billboard Reggae Albums chart in August 2013.

Background and launch concert
The album was mixed and mastered by Leriq at Solid Sound Studios in Ikota, Lagos. In an interview with BellaNaija, Burna Boy said he titled the album L.I.F.E in order to leave a lasting impact and showcase the realism of his life. In another interview with Toolz on NdaniTV, he described the album as a journey through life.

On July 17, 2013, Aristokrat Records unveiled the album's cover art to the general public. Peedi Picasso designed the cover art for both the standard and deluxe editions of the album. Burna Boy shares the cover art with Fela Kuti, King, Sunny Ade and Bob Marley. In a press release, the record label said the album would be released in three installments: street, original and deluxe. The record label also said the album's release would be accompanied by a release party, CD signatures and a tour. In August 2013, Burna Boy held an album listening party at Cafe Vanessa in Victoria Island. In September 2013, he launched a concert titled "The Burna Boy Experience" to promote the album in the cities of Accra and Sekondi-Takoradi.

Composition
L.I.F.E embodies a mixture of reggae, dancehall, Afrobeat and fuji sounds. The album draws heavily from the music of Fela Anikulapo Kuti, King Sunny Ade and Bob Marley. "No No No" is a fusion of the aforementioned genres. The groovy highlife track "Say So" contains a saxophone riff. "Na so E Suppose Be" is an ode to the coolness of 90s music. "Yawa Dey" is a tribute to the galala sound of several ragga artists from Ajegunle, including Daddy Showkey and Baba Fryo. In "Run My Race", Burna Boy impersonates Fela Kuti over an electro-Afrobeat instrumental. In "Boom Boom Boom", he samples a line from Fela Kuti's "Army Arrangement". The hook of "Smooth Sailing" consists of a Yoruba fairy tale. In "Outro: Remember Me", Burna Boy reiterates the album's themes to listeners.

Singles
The album's lead single "Like to Party" was released on May 30, 2012. The music video for the song was shot and directed in Lagos by Adasa Cookey. The album's second single "Tonight" was released on September 24, 2012; it was recorded in English, Yoruba, and Igbo. The music video for "Tonight" was directed by Mex and uploaded to YouTube at a total length of 4 minutes and 4 seconds. The video was nominated for Most Gifted Newcomer Video at the 2013 Channel O Music Video Awards.

The album's third single "Always Love You" was released on March 6, 2013; the song is a pop song with influences from house and dance music. "Run My Race" was released as the album's fourth single; it was recorded in English, Yoruba, and Nigerian Pidgin. The music video for "Run My Race" was shot and directed by Clarence Peters at the New Afrika Shrine. The album's fifth single "Yawa Dey" was released on August 5, 2013. Its music video was also directed by Clarence Peters and features various light-hearted scenes of posse dancing and beach soccer. A hyperrealist color scheme was used to shoot the video.

Reception

Critical reception

L.I.F.E  received positive reviews from music critics. Reviewing for Nigerian Entertainment Today, Ayomide Tayo praised the album's production and commended Leriq for not making it sound repetitive. However, Tayo also said it "lacks a knock out hit to seal the stateliness." Wilfred Okiche of YNaija reviewed the album and said it "avoids the pitfalls of monotony and boredom that could easily have befallen the disc but the overall sound is still a tad unsatisfying, like there is stuff Burna Boy is holding back." Ayo Alloh of Jaguda.com gave the album 8.5 stars out of 10, concluding it was never monotonous despite being solely produced. Enemigin Neye of Hip Hop World Magazine awarded the album 4 stars out of 5, saying "it goes to show the everyday improvement in the sound called Nigerian music". Neye "believes Burna Boy is here to stay, and believes the album is definitely one to remember."

Accolades
L.I.F.E was nominated for Best Album of the Year at the 2014 Nigeria Entertainment Awards. The album was also nominated for Best R&B/Pop Album and Album of the Year at The Headies 2014.

Commercial performance
The album was released in Nigeria and reportedly sold 40,000 copies on the first day of its release. The marketing rights for the album were later sold to Uba Pacific for ₦10 million.

Track listing

Notes
Leriq performed additional vocals on "Intro: My Life", "My Cry", and "Like to Party"
Simon Okechukwu performed additional vocals on "Guilty"
Paul "Pucado" Orisakwe performed additional vocals on "Ma Loda Ma Motto"

Sample credits
"Boom Boom Boom" samples a line from Fela Kuti's "Army Arrangement".

Personnel

Damini "Burna Boy" Ogulu – primary artist, writer, performer 
Eric "Leriq" Utere – producer, instrumentation, engineer, production co-ordination, mixing, mastering, background vocals
Enetimi Odom – featured artist, writer
Innocent Idibia – featured artist, writer
Olamide Adedeji – featured artist, writer 
Remilekun Safaru – featured artist, writer 
Jude Abaga – featured artist, writer 
Simon Okechukwu – background vocals, guitar
Paul "Pucado" Orisakwe – background vocals
Josiah – Saxophone
Maria Okarende – Voice tags
Piriye "Peedi Picasso" Isokrari – executive producer, management, album art direction

Charts

Release history

References

Burna Boy albums
2013 debut albums
Yoruba-language albums
Albums produced by Leriq